The Robert Morris Colonials men's ice hockey team is a National Collegiate Athletic Association (NCAA) Division I college ice hockey program that represents Robert Morris University. The team played its home games at the Clearview Arena, located at the RMU Island Sports Center in Neville Township, Pennsylvania, United States. The Colonials were a member of the Atlantic Hockey Conference. Until the 2009–10 season, the Colonials were a member of College Hockey America.

History
Robert Morris had a successful club hockey team for several years before rumors started circulating in the early 2000s that the school would create an NCAA Division I program.  In December 2002, reports first surfaced that the school was interested in purchasing the RMU Island Sports Center, which would house a men's and women's ice hockey team.  On August 8, 2003, the school officially purchased the 32-acre complex – complete with a 1,100-seat hockey arena – for $10 million.  The complex is located in Neville Island, only a few miles from RMU's campus in Moon Township.  Just 12 days later, on August 20, 2003, Robert Morris athletic director Susan Hofacre officially announced that the Colonials would field an NCAA men's ice hockey team for the 2004–05 season.  At the same time, the school added men's and women's lacrosse and women's field hockey as part of an expansion of the athletic department.  Two days later, the school hired former Western Michigan defenceman Derek Schooley as its first head coach.

In January 2004, before the school had ever played a game, they were accepted into the College Hockey America conference.  Typically, most new NCAA schools play as an Independent in their first years, but a unique series of events led to RMU being immediately accepted into the conference.  The fledgling six-team conference was first given an automatic bid to the 2003 NCAA Tournament.  However, in January 2004, CHA member Findlay announced they would drop hockey from its athletic program effective at the end of the 2003–04 season.  This left the CHA one team short of the six required to keep their automatic bid into the NCAA Tournament.  As RMU was the only NCAA team not already attached to a conference, the CHA invited RMU to join immediately for the 2004–05 season. The school accepted on January 29, 2004.

Schooley quickly moved to secure the Colonials' first recruiting class and hired two assistant coaches.  Nevertheless, the Colonials were predictably overmatched in their first year as an NCAA team.  The young squad consisted of 22 freshmen and no seniors as Schooley built for the school's future.  In its first season, the Colonials finished last in the conference with an 8–21–4 record.

At the start of the 2005–06 season, the Colonials were reminded how  much work the program needed to do when they were stunned by the Penn State University club team in a 3–2 exhibition loss prior to the season.  Two games later, however, RMU shocked CCHA member Western Michigan in a 5–2 victory that Schooley called "the biggest win for our program."  The Colonials improved to 12–20–3 in their second season while advancing to the CHA semifinals for the first time.

In 2006–07, the Colonials improved yet again, finishing 14–19–2.  On January 7, 2007, the Colonials beat nationally ranked Notre Dame for their first ever victory over a ranked team.  The squad advanced to the CHA tournament final, where they came up just short of qualifying for their first ever NCAA Tournament against Alabama–Huntsville.  The Colonials jumped out to a 4–0 first period lead and looked set for their first conference championship before the Chargers mounted a frantic comeback that ended with a 5–4 overtime victory.

It was more of the same for the Colonials over the next two years.  In 2007–08, the squad finished a school-record 15–15–4 (including a win over #8 ranked Boston University) but again came up short in the CHA tournament.  In 2008–09, the school finished only 10–19–7 before reaching the CHA tournament final against Bemidji State.  Once again, the Colonials were left heartbroken, as they lost in overtime for the second time in three years.

By this time, it was clear that the CHA would soon disband.  In 2006, Air Force left the league, leaving the conference with only five teams (one short of the six required to retain the NCAA autobid). Given two years to keep their autobid before losing it, the CHA began the search for a sixth member – likely a club team, as all current Division I teams were already in a conference.  After no school expressed interest in joining, Wayne State announced just prior to the 2007–08 season that they would disband their team following the season.  Following Wayne State's departure, saving the CHA was all but impossible, and Robert Morris applied for membership into Atlantic Hockey (AHA).  In January 2009, the AHA announced that both RMU and Niagara's applications were unanimously approved, paving the way for the schools to join the conference for the 2010–11 season.  Robert Morris and Penn State were the hosts of the inaugural Three Rivers Classic NCAA hockey tournament at the Consol Energy Center in December, 2012.

On May 26, 2021, Robert Morris University announced it would be cutting the men's and women's ice hockey programs. On December 17, 2021, it was announced the program would be reinstated for the 2023–24 season.

Season-by-season results

Source:

Records vs. current Atlantic Hockey teams
As of the completion of 2018–19 season

Head coaches
As of the completion of 2020–21 season

Players

Current roster
As of August 31, 2020.

Statistical leaders
Source:

Career points leaders

Career goaltending leaders

GP = Games played; Min = Minutes played; W = Wins; L = Losses; T = Ties; GA = Goals against; SO = Shutouts; SV% = Save percentage; GAA = Goals against average

Minimum 30 games

Statistics current through the start of the 2019-20 season.

Awards and honors

CHA

Individual Awards

Player of the Year
Ryan Cruthers: 2008

Student-Athlete of the Year
Joel Gasper: 2008

All-Conference Teams
First Team All-CHA

2007–08: Ryan Cruthers, F
2008–09: Denny Urban, D; Chris Margott, F; Nathan Longpre, F
2009–10: Denny Urban, D; Nathan Longpre, F

Second Team All-CHA

2006–07: Aaron Clarke, F
2007–08: Chris Margott, F
2009–10: Dave Cowan, D; Chris Kushneriuk, F

All-CHA Rookie Team

2004–05: Chris Kaufman, D; Jace Buzek, F
2005–06: Chris Margott, F
2007–08: Denny Urban, D; Nathan Longpre, F
2008–09: Brooks Ostergard, G; James Lyle, D
2009–10: Stefan Salituro, F

Atlantic Hockey

Individual Awards

Player of the Year
Zac Lynch: 2015
Nick Prkusic: 2021

Rookie of the Year
Randy Hernández: 2021

Best Defensive Forward
Nick Chiavetta: 2012

Best Defenseman
Denny Urban: 2011
Nick Jenny: 2021

Individual Sportsmanship Award
Furman South: 2011
Nick Jenny: 2021

Regular Season Scoring Trophy
Zac Lynch: 2016
Brady Ferguson: 2017

Coach of the Year
Derek Schooley: 2015, 2021

Most Valuable Player in Tournament
Cody Wydo: 2014

All-Conference Teams
First Team All-Atlantic Hockey

2010–11: Denny Urban, D; Nathan Longpre, F
2013–14: Cody Wydo, F
2014–15: Cody Wydo, F
2015–16: Greg Gibson, F; Zac Lynch, F
2016–17: Brady Ferguson, F
2017–18: Brady Ferguson, F
2020–21: Nick Jenny, D; Nick Prkusic, F

Second Team All-Atlantic Hockey

2012–13: Adam Brace, F
2015–16: Tyson Wilson, D
2018–19: Alex Tonge, F
2019–20: Justin Kapelmaster, G
2020–21: Noah West, G; Brendan Michaelian, D; Randy Hernández, F

Third Team All-Atlantic Hockey

2010–11: Brooks Ostergard, G
2011–12: Cody Crichton, F
2013–14: Terry Shafer, G
2014–15: Dalton Izyk, G; Chase Golightly, D; Zac Lynch, F
2015–16: Terry Shafer, G; Chase Golightly, D; Brandon Denham, F
2016–17: Eric Israel, D; Daniel Leavens, F
2017–18: Alex Tonge, F
2018–19: Frank Marotte, G

Atlantic Hockey All-Rookie Team

2011–12: Tyson Wilson, D
2014–15: Brady Ferguson, F
2016–17: Frank Marotte, G
2020–21: Noah West, G; Brian Kramer, D; Randy Hernández, F

Robert Morris Colonials Hall of Fame
The following is a list of people associated with the men's ice hockey program who were elected into the Robert Morris Colonials Hall of Fame (induction date in parenthesis).

Nathan Longpre (2017)
Chris Margott (2015)
Denny Urban (2018)

Colonials in the NHL
Source:
Robert Morris has yet to have an alumnus reach the NHL.

See also
 Robert Morris Lady Colonials ice hockey

References

External links
 

 
Ice hockey teams in Pennsylvania